"There's No One as Irish as Barack O'Bama" is a humorous folk song written in 2008 by the Irish band Hardy Drew and the Nancy Boys (later known as the Corrigan Brothers), and set to a tune derived from a traditional air. The song celebrates the Irish ancestry of the then Democratic candidate for President of the United States, Barack Obama. The song was a minor hit in the Irish charts, peaking at number 24 in  November 2008.

Production and themes

Obama's maternal roots have been traced back to Moneygall in County Offaly, Ireland in the 19th century. Moneygall has a population of 298 people. Obama had previously remarked, "There's a little village in Ireland where my great-great-great grandfather came from and I'm looking forward to going there and having a pint," prompting the Irish Taoiseach Brian Cowen - also a native of County Offaly - to invite him to do so.
 
Hardy Drew and the Nancy Boys consists of brothers Ger, Brian and Donnacha Corrigan from Castletroy, County Limerick. The song was performed by the band's lead singer Ger Corrigan, with Aedhmar Flaherty, Róisín O'Brien and Aodhán Ryan, in Ollie Hayes's pub in Moneygall. It was originally written by the established group in February 2008, and the group have since appeared on several Irish television and radio shows. It has since been featured on MSNBC show Hardball with Chris Matthews.

The song, which received huge publicity in America and was described as a "web hit" by the BBC, became popular after being released on YouTube, and as of 6 November 2008 it had over 50,000 hits, (80,000 by 10 November, 300,000 by 15 November, whilst Black's version had 700,000) and the band reported that they had been invited to perform in the anticipated victory celebrations for Obama, and at the Irish-American Democrats inauguration party in Washington in January 2009.

Conflicts
Ger Corrigan alleged that Shay Black, brother of Irish musician Mary Black, "hijacked" the song and claimed a co-writing credit while failing to acknowledge Hardy Drew and the Nancy Boys' authorship of the original version, a charge Black denied.

Both sides sought legal advice; the band contacted YouTube's solicitors as well as a copyright solicitor before announcing in a press release that the dispute had been resolved.

Journalist Fintan O'Toole criticized the song in The Irish Times for "its ignorance of cultural history", claiming that it was inappropriate given Irish Americans' history of racism against African Americans, and that emphasizing Obama's Irish heritage would be "muscling in on his parade". Canon Stephen Neill, the rector of Moneygall who accompanied the band on their American trip, responded that it was only a pop song, and that African Americans had universally welcomed them.

Ger Corrigan later reported that the Corrigan Brothers had signed a deal with Universal for two singles and one album, with an option on a second album.

Welcome Home President Barack O'Bama

In March 2011, the Corrigan Brothers released a new version of their song for radio play to celebrate Barack Obama's visit to Ireland the following May. Entitled Welcome Home President Barack O'Bama, the song focused on Obama's visit to his ancestral home in Moneygall.

References

External links
Corrigan Brothers website
Song lyrics on the website
HardyDrew's YouTube listing (official)
Shay Black version YouTube listing (official)
CorriganBrothers verstion YouTube listing (official)
Interview with Ger Corrigan by Ryan Tubridy; RTÉ Radio One on 30 September 2008.

2008 singles
Irish-American culture
Irish songs
Songs about Ireland
Songs about Barack Obama
2008 songs
2008 YouTube videos